Turritella vermicularis is an extinct species of sea snail, a marine gastropod mollusk in the family Turritellidae.

These sea snails lived from the Miocene to the Pliocene epoch, approximately from 37.2 to 2.588 million years ago.

Description

Distribution
Fossils have been found in the Pliocene sediments in Italy and Spain, in the Miocene of Austria, Italy and Romania and in the Eocene of Namibia.

References

 Brocchi, G. B. (1814) Conchiologia fossile subapennina con osservazioni geologiche sugli Apennini e sul suolo adiacente. Milano Vol. I: pp. LXXX + 56 + 240; Vol. II, p. 241-712, pl. 1–16

Turritellidae
Gastropods described in 1814